RaiQuan Kelvan Gray (born July 7, 1999) is an American professional basketball player for the Long Island Nets of the NBA G League. He played college basketball for the Florida State Seminoles.

Early life and high school career
Gray grew up playing football and started playing basketball at age nine. He attended Dillard High School in Fort Lauderdale, Florida. Gray played the point guard position despite being 6 ft 8 in (2.03 m) and 260 lbs (118 kg). As a junior, he led Dillard to the Class 6A state title. In his senior season, Gray won the Class 7A state title. He committed to playing college basketball for Florida State over offers from Baylor and Memphis.

College career
Gray redshirted his first year at Florida State. As a freshman, he averaged 3.9 points in 12.3 minutes per game. Gray averaged six points and 3.8 rebounds per game as a sophomore. He improved his conditioning in the offseason. On February 13, 2021, he recorded a career-high 24 points and 12 rebounds in a 92–85 win over Wake Forest. As a junior, Gray averaged 11.9 points, 6.4 rebounds and 2.2 assists per game, earning Third Team All-Atlantic Coast Conference honors. On April 2, 2021, he declared for the 2021 NBA draft, forgoing his remaining college eligibility.

Professional career

Long Island Nets (2021–present)
Gray was selected in the second round of the 2021 NBA draft with the 59th pick by the Brooklyn Nets. Gray was later included in the roster of the Brooklyn Nets for the 2021 NBA Summer League. On October 25, 2021, Gray was included in the training camp roster of the Long Island Nets.

On September 26, 2022, Gray was signed by the Brooklyn Nets who waived him at the end of training camp. On November 4, 2022, Gray was named to the opening night roster for the Long Island Nets.

Career statistics

College

|-
| style="text-align:left;"|2017–18
| style="text-align:left;"|Florida State
| style="text-align:center;" colspan="11"| Redshirt
|-
| style="text-align:left;"|2018–19
| style="text-align:left;"|Florida State
| 36 || 4 || 12.3 || .435 || .313 || .721 || 2.3 || .8 || .8 || .2 || 3.9
|-
| style="text-align:left;"|2019–20
| style="text-align:left;"|Florida State
| 29 || 24 || 19.5 || .392 || .220 || .696 || 3.8 || 1.4 || 1.1 || .7 || 6.0
|-
| style="text-align:left;"|2020–21
| style="text-align:left;"|Florida State
| 25 || 24 || 26.3 || .517 || .267 || .763 || 6.4 || 2.2 || 1.2 || .7 || 11.9
|- class="sortbottom"
| style="text-align:center;" colspan="2"|Career
| 90 || 52 || 18.5 || .458 || .262 || .732 || 3.9 || 1.4 || 1.0 || .5 || 6.8

Personal life
Gray has a sister and a brother. His cousin, Quinn Gray, played in the National Football League (NFL) as a quarterback before embarking on a coaching career.

References

External links
 Florida State Seminoles bio

1999 births
Living people
American men's basketball players
Basketball players from Florida
Brooklyn Nets draft picks
Florida State Seminoles men's basketball players
Long Island Nets players
Power forwards (basketball)
Sportspeople from Fort Lauderdale, Florida